Valeureuse was a 40-gun Valeureuse-class (modified ) frigate of the French Navy, launched in 1798 and so damaged in a storm in 1806 that she was sold for breaking up.

Career
Valeureuse took part in the Atlantic campaign of 1806 in Willaumez's squadron. The French squadron left Brest on 14 December 1805.

On the cruise Valeureuse visited São Salvador, Guyane, and Fort-de-France.

On 14 August 1806 Valeureuse captured and sank the merchantman Hebe, Teuton, master, which had been sailing from Trinidad to Bermuda.

Fate
In August 1806, a storm caused Valeureuse to separate from the fleet. She took refuge on 31 August in Delaware Bay, where she arrived dismasted. Valeureuse was in such a bad state that she had to be sold. 

On 24 October Lloyd's List reported that Valeureuse had gone into Philadelphia. She was condemned at Philadelphia, and was sold at Marcus Hook, Pennsylvania.

Her officers and crew, and stores were put aboard the American ship George Washington. On 15 January 1807 HMS Blanche intercepted George Washington off Bordeaux. The British found that she was carrying Captain Kargarian (Kergariou), the former commander of Valeureuse, and 306 of his officers and men, but no stores from Valeureuse. The British took the Frenchmen aboard Blanche as prisoners and then sent George Washington to England. George Washington arrived at Portsmouth on 2 February.

Citations and references
Citations

References

 

Valeureuse-class frigates
Age of Sail frigates of France
1798 ships
Ships built in France